Vermont/Santa Monica station (also known as Vermont/Santa Monica/L.A. City College station) is an underground rapid transit (known locally as a subway) station on the B Line of the Los Angeles Metro Rail system. It is located under Vermont Avenue at its intersection with Santa Monica Boulevard, after which the station is named, in the East Hollywood neighborhood of Los Angeles.

Vermont/Santa Monica has two entrances on Vermont Avenue, a north entrance and a south entrance. The north entrance faces Santa Monica Boulevard. The south entrance, near Lockwood Avenue, is adjacent to Los Angeles City College and three blocks from the Braille Institute.

Service

Station layout 
Vermont/Santa Monica is a two-story station; the top level is a mezzanine with ticket machines while the bottom is the platform level. The station uses a simple island platform with two tracks.

Hours and frequency

Connections 
, the following connections are available:
 LADOT DASH: Hollywood

Station design 

Vermont/Santa Monica, like many of the B Line stations, was designed by an artist/architect team. For this station, artist Robert Millar collaborated with the architectural firm Ellerbe Becket with Mehrdad Yazdani as lead designer. The centerpiece of their design is the large stainless steel “wing” canopy over the entrance at the corner of Vermont & Santa Monica, along with skylights that flood the 42-foot high space with light during the day, and become a brightly lit “stage” at night.

The team also worked with the nearby Braille Institute and LA City College to incorporate a variety of interesting textures into the design and Robert Millar layered thousands of subtly painted questions onto the concrete surfaces of the station.

The station team received a Progressive Architecture Award for the design.

References 

B Line (Los Angeles Metro) stations
East Hollywood, Los Angeles
Railway stations in the United States opened in 1999
1999 establishments in California